The Curuá Una River is a river of Pará state in north-central Brazil, a right tributary of the Amazon River.

The river flows through the Tapajós-Xingu moist forests ecoregion.
Part of the river basin is in the Tapajós National Forest, a  sustainable use conservation unit created in 1974.
The Moju River, a tributary of the Curuá-Una, rises in the national forest.

See also
List of rivers of Pará

References

Brazilian Ministry of Transport

Rivers of Pará
Tributaries of the Amazon River